Two Worlds Collide may refer to:

 Two Worlds Collide, an album by Australian group The McClymonts
 SNL Digital Shorts skit with Samberg and Thompson
 "Two Worlds Collide", a song by JAG from the album Fire in the Temple and later by Giant on the album Promise Land
 "Two Worlds Collide", a song by Inspiral Carpets from the album Revenge of the Goldfish
 "Two Worlds Collide", a song by Demi Lovato from the album Don't Forget
 "Two Worlds Collide" (Demi Lovato song), 2008